The Voskhod rocket ("ascent", "dawn") was a derivative of the Soviet R-7 ICBM designed for the human spaceflight programme but later used for launching Zenit reconnaissance satellites. It consisted of the Molniya 8K78M third stage minus the Blok L. In 1966, all R-7 variants were equipped with the uprated core stage and strap-ons of the Soyuz 11A511. The Blok I stage in the Voskhod booster used the RD-0107 engine rather than the crew-rated and more powerful RD-0110 used on the Soyuz. The sole exceptions to this were the two crewed Voskhod launches, which had RD-0108 engines, a crew-rated RD-0107 but with the same performance.

All 11A57s launched after 1965 were functionally 11A511s without the Soyuz's payload shroud and launch escape system (with the exception of the second-stage propulsion system as noted above). Around 300 were flown from Baikonur and Plesetsk through 1976 (various payloads, but Zenith IMINT satellites were the most common). The newer 11A511U core had been introduced in 1973, but the existing stock of 11A57s took another three years to use up.

The rocket had a streak of 86 consecutive successful launches between 11 September 1967 and 9 July 1970.

See also 
 Voskhod programme

References

1963 in spaceflight
1964 in spaceflight
1965 in spaceflight
1973 in spaceflight
1974 in spaceflight
Voskhod program
Space launch vehicles of the Soviet Union
R-7 (rocket family)
Vehicles introduced in 1963